Bylina is a type of East Slavic epic narrative poem.

Bylina may also refer to:
Bylina (airline)
Bylina, Pomeranian Voivodeship (north Poland)